"Stand Above Me" is a song by English electronic band Orchestral Manoeuvres in the Dark (OMD), released as the first single from their album Liberator (released a few weeks ahead of the album), and their 26th single overall. It was the last OMD single released on a 12" format before the group took a break in 1996. The next 12" to be released under the OMD name was "Metroland" in March 2013.

An "anonymous" club 12" was released as "Liberator: Stand Above Me". It appeared to be credited to the act "Liberator". The song peaked at number 5 on the US modern rock chart and number 6 on the US dance chart.

Reception
The Huddersfield Daily Examiner named "Stand Above Me" their "Single of the Week", observing "a strong slice of synth-pop with a grinding bass swell". Billboard wrote, "For public tastes that run to infectiously upbeat bubblegum pop with some muscle, this track, from the chronically overlooked venerable British pop outfit, will do the trick. Features fat, raspy synths, a rollicking beat, and sweet, strong vocal harmonies." Music Week scored the single 3/5 but considered it "bland" in comparison to OMD's earlier work.

Track listing

7" single
Virgin / VS 1444 (UK)
"Stand Above Me" – 3:33
"Can I Believe You" – 3:52

12" single (UK)
Virgin / VST1444 (UK)
"Stand Above Me" (Transcendental Constant Viper Trip Mix)
"Stand Above Me"
"Stand Above Me" (A 10 Minute Therapy Session into Hyperlife Mix)

12" single (USA)
Virgin / SPRO-12777 (USA, promo)
"Stand Above Me" (A 10 Minute Therapy Session into Hyperlife Mix) – 9:40
"Stand Above Me" (7" Mix) – 3:32
"Stand Above Me" (12" Mix) – 10:13

"Liberator: Stand Above Me" 12" single
Union Recordings / ucrtdj18 (USA)
"Stand Above Me"
"Stand Above Me (A 10 Minute Therapy Session into Hyperlife)" (remix)

CD single
Virgin / VSCDT 1444 (UK, Jewel case), VSCDG 1444 (UK, Digipack)
 "Stand Above Me" – 3:33
 "Stand Above Me" (Transcendental Constant Viper Trip Mix) – 10:15
 "Stand Above Me" (Hypnofunk Mix) – 5:58
 "Can I Believe You" – 3:52

Cassette single
Virgin / VSC 1444 (UK)
 "Stand Above Me" – 3:33
 "Can I Believe You" – 3:52
Both sides of the cassette have the same track listing.

Charts

References

1993 singles
Orchestral Manoeuvres in the Dark songs
Songs written by Andy McCluskey
1993 songs
Virgin Records singles
Songs written by Stuart Kershaw